The Sous River, Sus River or Souss River (Berber: Asif en Sus, Arabic: واد سوس) is a river in mid-southern Morocco located in the Sous region. It originates in the High Atlas and flows west passing Aoulouz, Taroudannt, Oulad Teima, Inezgane and Aït Melloul. It forms a basin which is protected from the desertic climate of the Sahara by the Anti-Atlas mountains and is one of Morocco's most fertile regions.

The Aoulouz Dam is the main dam on this river.

See also

 Sous
 Agadir
 Taroudannt
 Inezgan
 Ait Melloul

References

Rivers of Morocco
Geography of Souss-Massa